This is a list of Hampton Pirates football players in the NFL Draft.

Key

Selections

References

Hampton

Hampton Pirates NFL Draft